John Gaddis may refer to:

John Gaddi, one of the leaders of the Maccabeans in the First Book of Maccabees
John Lewis Gaddis, American historian
John W. Gaddis, architect of Vincennes, Indiana